Stadionul Electromagnetica is a multi-purpose stadium in Bucharest, Romania. It is currently used mostly for football matches and is the home ground of Asalt București and ACS Rapid FNG. The stadium holds 2,000 people and was opened in the interwar period, being the only stadium opened in Bucharest in that period that is still in use. For 66 years the stadium was the homeground of Rapid II București, team that was known in the past as Electromagnetica București. The scoreboard is an unusual one, being the old scoreboard from the Stadionul Republicii, moved here when the stadium was demolished.

References

External links
Stadionul Electromagnetica at soccerway.com

Football venues in Romania
CS Rapid București
Sports venues in Bucharest
Buildings and structures in Bucharest